Bajimaat is a 2008 Bengali film directed by Haranath Chakraborty.This is the debut film as lead hero of Soham in Bengali cinema.

Plot
Suvra (Soham Chakraborty) is a lower middle class young boy, who dreams of becoming a big singer. His girlfriend Jhilik (Subhashree Ganguly) also dreams of becoming a singer. Suvra and Jhilik are both trapped by a company of a reality show organisation. Suvra loses a lakh of rupees, which is actually his college admission fee for computer engineering. But his father cannot bear this shock and suffers from a massive heart attack. To save his family, Suvra gives up his dream and starts working for a TV Channel. The CEO of this TV channel, Sanjay Sen supports Suvra. On the other hand, Jhilik is also exploited by Rohit, son of the reality show organiser. Rohit separates Suvra and Jhilik. But ultimately, with the sponsorship of Sanjay Sen and the sacrifice of Jhilik, Suvra becomes the Singer of Bengal. Suvra and Jhilik are reunited as lovers.

Cast
 Soham Chakraborty as Suvra
 Subhashree Ganguly as Jhilik
 Ranjit Mallick as Sanjay Mitra
 Rajatava Dutta as Satyabrata
 Santu Mukhopadhyay as Suvra's Father
 Aparajita Auddy as Sister of Jhilik
 Biswanath Basu as Suvra's Friend
 Soumili Biswas as Sister of Suvra
 Sudip Mukherjee as Husband of Jhilik's Sister
 Rajesh Sharma as Charu Babu
 Surajit Sen as Rohit

Soundtrack
 A Gaan Amar – Karthik
 Amar Gaaner (Female Vocals) – Alka Yagnik
 Amar Gaaner (Male Vocals) – Kartick
 Amar Prothom Prem – Kartick
 Bedonar Baluchore – Monu
 Chena Chena A Poth – Alka Yagnik
 Dhum Ta Na Na – Kartick
 Hi Baby Shono Na – Kartick
 Meghla Dine Meghla Mon – Alka Yagnik
 Sure Sure Sat Sure – Alka Yagnik

References

External links
gomolo.in
www.telegraphindia.com preview
www.screenindia.com preview

2008 films
2000s Bengali-language films
Bengali-language Indian films
Films scored by S. P. Venkatesh
Films directed by Haranath Chakraborty